The Sakanila River is a river on the east coast of Madagascar, flowing into the Indian Ocean at Maintinandry, south of Vatomandry.

A bridge on Route nationale 11 (Madagascar) crosses the Sakanila west of Maintinandry.

The Madagascar Ethnobotany Program is located upriver at Ambalabe.

References

Rivers of Madagascar
Rivers of Atsinanana